The Type 051B destroyer (NATO reporting name: Luhai class) is a class of destroyer built by the People's Republic of China. It consists of only one ship, Shenzhen (167). When Shenzhen was commissioned into the People's Liberation Army Navy Surface Force in 1998, it was then the largest surface combatant that China had ever built. The Type 051B was succeeded by the domestic Type 052B destroyer, discounting the 4 Soviet-built Sovremenny-class destroyer that China purchased in the interim.

History 
Shenzhen was laid down by the Dalian Shipyard in May 1996. The Shenzhen was intended to be an experimental vessel with improvements over the Luhu class in terms of modular construction and stealth. The ship is powered by two indigenous steam turbine engines, due to Dalian Shipyard's experience in steam turbine construction and that Chinese domestic research and development on marine gas turbines had not yet matured. The displacement of the Luhai class is 2,000 tons heavier than the Type 052 destroyer, Luhu class. Shenzhen was launched in 1997, although official revelation of the ship's existence did not come until the year following its commissioning. The chief designer of this class is academic, Mr. Pan Jingfu (潘镜芙), who is also the designer of both the Type 051B's predecessor and successor.

The main purpose of the Type 051B was to gain experience in modern naval ship design and construction, and refining the knowledge and skills accumulated from the earlier Type 052, such as integrating many different foreign subsystems on the Type 052 more effectively. The ship is powered by steam turbines due to the 1989 western arms embargo and that domestic gas turbines were not ready in time. The Type 051B also employed stealth construction techniques which resulted in a smaller radar cross section in comparison to its predecessor. Analysts speculated that the ship would have been equipped with an VLS system in the forward section for air-defense SAMs. However, when the ship was finally revealed, it was still armed with the 8-cell HQ-7 SAM launcher. These SAMs lack effectiveness against sea skimming missiles with multiple approaching angles. The PLAN was unsatisfied with the design and no further ships of the class were built. At the time, area air defence for the fleet was the PLAN's priority which older systems couldn't sufficiently provide, and since the capability couldn't be served by the final vessel the gap remained open. As a result, the decision to import two pairs of Sovremenny-class destroyer from Russia was determined to fulfil the role. However, Type 051B does have an advantage over earlier Chinese principle surface combatants and Russian ships in that it is the first Chinese naval ship to be equipped with fleet formation command and control system so it can act as a flagship of the fleet.

The sole Type 051B destroyer Shenzhen participated in the PLA Navy's first goodwill visit to Africa in 2000, the first visit to Europe in 2001 and the first visit to Japan in 2007. In 2004, the ship received its mid-life modernization refit, with its original 100 mm main gun and the HQ-7 air defense missile system being replaced by improved models.

Shenzhen visited Kochi, India for four days in August 2009, after deployment in the Gulf of Aden on anti-piracy operations.

2015 Refit and upgrades
In early 2015, Shenzhen was spotted at the Zhanjiang naval base undergoing work. Initially it was unclear whether this was due to a midlife refit program or decommissioning, but pictures revealed in January 2016 that the ship was being refitted with new systems. For self-defense, the four old Type 76A 37 mm AA guns were replaced with two H/PJ-11 eleven-barreled 30 mm CIWS (export designation Type 1130), one covering each side.

Anti-aircraft defense is upgraded from the 8-unit HQ-7 with a  range to a 32-cell vertical launch system (VLS) in front of the superstructure for -ranged HQ-16s, directed by four Type 345 (Front-Dome type) illuminators, increasing SAM coverage by 16 times. The helicopter hangar was modified to carry a single Ka-28 ASW helicopter in place of the original dual Z-9 hangar, and two new mast structures were fitted; a Type 382 Radar on the forward mast and a Type 364 targeting radar (under dome) on the aft mast. The upgrades give the Type 051B weapon and sensor capabilities similar to the Type 054A frigate. The Type 382 replaced the Type 381 singe-faced phased-array radar, and moved from the aft to the forward mast to remove the blind arc it previously exhibited, the quarterdeck was fully enclosed, and new apertures were added in the transom indicating that torpedo decoy and towed array sonar systems have been added; a variable depth sonar has not been installed. The ship completed the weapon systems upgrade in August 2016.

In May 2020, it was revealed that the Type 051B had its YJ-83 subsonic ASMs replaced with 16 supersonic YJ-12 missiles.

Ships of Class

See also
List of naval ship classes in service

References

External links 

 Sino Defense Today
 Chinese Military News Blog

Destroyer classes